Trenton is a town in Edgefield County, South Carolina, United States. The population was 196 at the 2010 census, down from 226 in 2000.

History
Bettis Academy and Junior College and Marshfield, a historic plantation house with outbuilding and cemetery, are listed on the National Register of Historic Places.

Painter Wenonah Bell was born in Trenton.

Geography
Trenton is located in eastern Edgefield County at  (33.739721, -81.840208). South Carolina Highway 121 passes through the western side of the town, intersecting U.S. Route 25 at the southwest corner of the town. US 25 leads northwest  to Edgefield, the county seat, and southwest  to Augusta, Georgia, while SC 121 leads northeast  to Johnston.

Demographics

2000 census
As of the census of 2000, there were 226 people, 103 households, and 67 families residing in the town. The racial makeup of the town was 69.47% White and 30.53% African American. Hispanic or Latino of any race were 3.10% of the population.

There were 103 households, out of which 19.4% had children under the age of 18 living with them, 42.7% were married couples living together, 19.4% had a female householder with no husband present, and 34.0% were non-families. 32.0% of all households were made up of individuals, and 15.5% had someone living alone who was 65 years of age or older. The average household size was 2.19 and the average family size was 2.69.

In the town, the population was spread out, with 18.6% under the age of 18, 7.1% from 18 to 24, 23.5% from 25 to 44, 31.4% from 45 to 64, and 19.5% who were 65 years of age or older. The median age was 45 years. For every 100 females, there were 93.2 males. For every 100 females age 18 and over, there were 93.7 males.

The median income for a household in the town was $26,250, and the median income for a family was $41,667. Males had a median income of $31,875 versus $29,583 for females. The per capita income for the town was $17,352. About 30.8% of families and 27.1% of the population were below the poverty line, including 41.7% of those under the age of eighteen and 20.0% of those 65 or over.

2010 census
According to the 2010 census, Trenton has a population of 196.  Of the population, 129 (65.8%) were White, 62 (31.6%) were Black or African American, 0 (0%) were American Indian or Alaska Native, 0 (0%) were Asian, 0 (0%) were Pacific Islanders, 5 (2.6%),some other race, 0 (0%) Two or more races.  8 (4.1%) were Hispanic or Latino (of any race)

Notable People
David E. Harris, the first African American commercial airline pilot and pilot captain for a major U.S. commercial airline.

Benjamin Tillman, United States Senator from South Carolina and Governor of South Carolina.

References

External links
Town of Trenton official website
   

Towns in Edgefield County, South Carolina
Towns in South Carolina
Augusta metropolitan area